A designated place is a type of geographic unit used by Statistics Canada to disseminate census data. It is usually "a small community that does not meet the criteria used to define incorporated municipalities or Statistics Canada population centres (areas with a population of at least 1,000 and no fewer than 400 persons per square kilometre)." Provincial and territorial authorities collaborate with Statistics Canada in the creation of designated places so that data can be published for sub-areas within municipalities. Starting in 2016, Statistics Canada allowed the overlapping of designated places with population centres.

In the 2021 Census of Population, British Columbia had 332 designated places, an increase from 326 in 2016. Designated place types in British Columbia include 55 Indian reserves, 13 island trusts, 5 Nisga'a villages, 5 retired population centres, and 254 unincorporated places. British Columbia's largest designated place is Walnut Grove with a population of 28,420.

List

See also 
List of census agglomerations in British Columbia
List of population centres in British Columbia

Notes

References 

Designated places